Wadi Kabir (means Great Valley in English) is a township near to Ruwi in Muscat, in northeastern Oman.

References

Populated places in the Muscat Governorate